Bernard Buffet (10 July 1928 – 4 October 1999) was a French painter, printmaker, and sculptor.

He produced a varied and extensive body of work. His style was exclusively figurative. The artist enjoyed worldwide popularity early in his career but was shunned by art pundits later on. 

Today, there is a renewed interest in Bernard Buffet's oeuvre. His works can be seen in the collections of the world's leading museums, including the Musée d'Art Moderne de Paris, the Tate, and the Museum of Modern Art.

Biography 
Bernard Buffet was born in 1928. He hailed from a middle-class family with roots in Northern and Western France. His spent his childhood in Paris. His mother often took him to the Louvre Museum, where he got familiar with the works of Realist painters, such as Gustave Courbet. This is likely to have influenced his style. In 1955, he painted a work that paid tribute to Courbet's Le Sommeil. 

Bernard Buffet was a student at the Lycée Carnot during the Nazi occupation of Paris. He travelled to drawings courses in the evenings despite the curfew imposed by the Nazi authorities. He then studied art at the École Nationale Supérieure des Beaux-Arts (National School of the Fine Arts) and worked in the studio of the painter Eugène Narbonne. Among his classmates were Maurice Boitel and Louis Vuillermoz. He met the French painter Marie-Thérèse Auffray and was influenced by her work.

Buffet's mother, Blanche, died from breast cancer in 1945. Seventeen-year-old Buffet was devastated. Losing his mother at an early age remained a source of melancholy throughout his life. 

Sustained by the picture-dealer Maurice Garnier, Buffet produced religious pieces, landscapes, portraits and still-lifes. In 1946, he had his first painting shown, a self-portrait, at the Salon des Moins de Trente Ans at the Galerie Beaux-Arts. He had at least one major exhibition every year. Buffet illustrated "Les Chants de Maldoror" written by Comte de Lautréamont in 1952. In 1955, he was awarded the first prize by the magazine Connaissance des Arts, which named the ten best post-war artists. In 1958, at the age of 30, the first retrospective of his work was held at the Galerie Charpentier.

Pierre Bergé was Buffet's live-in lover until Bergé left Buffet for Yves Saint Laurent.

On 12 December 1958, Buffet married the writer and actress Annabel Schwob. They adopted three children. Daughter Virginie was born in 1962; daughter Danielle, in 1963; and son Nicolas, in 1973. Bernard Buffet was named "Chevalier de la Légion d'Honneur" in 1973.

On 23 November 1973, the Bernard Buffet Museum was founded by Kiichiro Okano, in Surugadaira, Japan.

At the request of the French postal administration in 1978, he designed a stamp depicting the Institut et le Pont des Arts – on this occasion the Post Museum arranged a retrospective of his works.

Buffet created more than 8,000 paintings and many prints as well.

Buffet died by suicide at his home in Tourtour, southern France, on 4 October 1999. He was suffering from Parkinson's disease and was no longer able to work. Police said that Buffet died around 4 p.m after putting his head in a plastic bag attached around his neck with tape.

The popularity of Buffet's work, as well as the level of media attention around his lifestyle, were quite high in the 1950s and 1960s. Although he kept on painting throughout his life, there was a certain decline in interest in his work in the last decades of the 20th century, especially in France. This decline in popularity was partly influenced by his fall from grace with French art pundits, whose support and interest shifted away from figurative art.

In the 21st century, there has been a renewed spike in interest in the work of Buffet. With some successful exhibitions in France and throughout the world. In 2016, British author Nicholas Foulkes published Bernard Buffet: The Invention of the Modern Mega-Artist, in which he offers a controversial biographical account of Buffet's life and work.

Theme exhibitions (selection)
 1952 La Passion du Christ
 1954 Horreur de la Guerre
 1958 Jeanne d'Arc
 1961 Portraits d'Annabel
 1962 La Chapelle de Château l'Arc
 1965 Les ecorches
 1967 La corrida
 1971 Les Folles
 1977 L'enfer de Dante
 1978 The French Revolution
 1989 Vingt mille lieues sous les mers
 1991 Souvenirs d'Italie
 1991 New York
 1992 Les Clowns Musiciens
 1992 Saint-Petersburg
 1993 L'Empire ou les plaisirs de la guerre
 1993 Promenade Provencale
 1995 Sept peches capitaux
 1996 Pekin
 1998 La maison
 1999 Mes Singes
 2000 La mort

Awards
 1947 Member of the Salon d'Automne
 1947 Member of the Société des Artistes Indépendants
 1948 co-recipient of the Prix de la Critique with Bernard Lorjou
 1950 Prix Puvis de Chavannes
 1955 First Prize by Magazine Connaissance
 1973 Officer of the Légion d'Honneur
 1974 Member of the Académie des Beaux-Arts

Collections (selection)
 ARTAX, Düsseldorf
 Boca Raton Museum of Art
 Ca la Ghironda, Bologna
 Kunstmuseum Walter, Augsburg
 Musée d´art moderne de Lille, Villeneuve d´Ascq
 Museum of Contemporary Art, Skopje
 National Gallery for Foreign Art, Sofia
 National Gallery of Canada, Ottawa
 National Museum of Western Art, Tokyo
 Tampere Art Museum
 Tate Gallery, London
 Wellside Gallery, Seoul
 Alexandre de Bothuri collection, Palm Beach, USA " Le Clown Jaune" 1955

Cultural references

Film
 Bernard Buffet, a 1956 film by Étienne Périer

References

External links

 Musée Bernard Buffet
 Artnet.com Report from Paris by Adrian Darmon 10-25-99: Buffet obituary
 Portrait of Bernard Buffet by Reginald Gray (2009, after a drawing from life made by Gray in 1963)

20th-century French painters
20th-century French male artists
French male painters
Artists who committed suicide
People with Parkinson's disease
1928 births
1999 deaths
École des Beaux-Arts alumni
Members of the Académie des beaux-arts
Painters who committed suicide
Recipients of the Legion of Honour
French LGBT painters
French LGBT sculptors
Bisexual painters
Bisexual sculptors
Bisexual men
1999 suicides
20th-century French LGBT people